Hashan Chuchg is a populated place situated in Pima County, Arizona, close to the United States' international border with Mexico.

References

Populated places in Pima County, Arizona